Samuel Belzberg,  (June 26, 1928 – March 30, 2018) was a Canadian businessman and philanthropist.

Biography
Samuel Belzberg was born to a Jewish family  in Calgary, Alberta and educated at the University of Alberta. In 1962, he founded the provincial trust company, City Savings and Trust in Edmonton which was heavily involved in real-estate development financing. In 1968, he moved to Vancouver with his brothers, Hyman Belzberg (1925-2017) and William Belzberg (1932-2014), and formed Western Realty. In 1970, he founded First City Financial Corp as the parent company for City Savings and Trust. In 1973, Belzberg and his brothers sold Western Realty and purchased Far West Financial Corp of California, marking their entrance into the United States. By the late 1980s, First City Financial Corp, now a diversified holding company, had assets of $5.4 billion with operations in Canada and the US. First City was involved in many large investment transactions including Bache Securities before it was sold to Prudential, Gulf Oil, Armstrong World (a large building supply company) and Scovill (a manufacturing company which included Yale Locks, Hamilton Beach, NuTone) which they purchased in 1985 for $523 million.

During the 1990s, Belzberg founded Balfour Holdings Ltd., a real estate company which, at its peak, operated over 26 projects spreading through the United States. Balfour's mandate was to profit from the dislocations in value in the United States due to the Savings and Loan crisis. Balfour subdivided and serviced its purchased lands and sold the lots to National Builders. In 1997, Balfour was sold to The Blackstone Group, a large U.S. private equity group and generated realized returns in excess of 20% per annum. During the 1990s, Mr. Belzberg was an active acquirer of distressed property in Alberta where values had dramatically declined due to the softness in the oil industry. These properties were subsequently divested when the market recovered. In 1992, Belzberg started a private real estate and equity investments company, which is now called Gibralt Capital Corporation.

Philanthropy and awards
Belzberg served on various Board of Directors and is involved with numerous charities. He was awarded the Order of Canada in 1989 from the Governor General, and also in 1989 he received an honorary doctorate from Simon Fraser University. 

The "Samuel and Frances Belzberg Library" at Simon Fraser University is named after the couple.

Personal life
Belzberg died on March 30, 2018, in Vancouver, and is survived by his wife of 68 years, Frances, and four children: Marc, Lisa, Wendy, and Sherry. His daughter Wendy married Strauss Zelnick, the founder of ZMC and head of Take Two Interactive in 1990. His daughter Lisa, was married to and has three children (Sasha, Tess and Ezekiel) with American businessman, entrepreneur and philanthropist Matthew Bronfman, son of Canadian billionaire Edgar Bronfman Sr.

References

 Belzberg at The Canadian Encyclopedia

1928 births
2018 deaths
Businesspeople from Calgary
Businesspeople from Vancouver
Canadian chief executives
Canadian financiers
Canadian real estate businesspeople
Jewish Canadian philanthropists
Members of the Order of British Columbia
Officers of the Order of Canada
University of Alberta alumni
20th-century philanthropists